Przyborów  is a village in the administrative district of Gmina Jeleśnia, within Żywiec County, Silesian Voivodeship, in southern Poland.

Przyborów is located in a valley of the Żywiec Beskids mountains, on the Koszarawa mountain river (a tributary of the Soła).

The village has a population of 1,793.

The village is of tourist interest due to the trail that starts here towards Mędralowa, Babia Góra and other local peaks.

References

Villages in Żywiec County